Captain Jack is a 1999 British comedy film produced by John Goldschmidt and written by Jack Rosenthal. The cast includes Bob Hoskins, Sadie Frost, Gemma Jones, Anna Massey, Peter McDonald, Maureen Lipman and Michele Dotrice. The film was produced by Goldschmidt's own company Viva Films Ltd. and was distributed on video by Koch Vision.

Plot
Captain Jack stars Bob Hoskins as a rebellious captain of a small Whitby boat who is determined to flout petty maritime bureaucracy. Officials declare his boat unsafe for a planned voyage to the Arctic, but Jack is determined to set sail and to place a plaque there in commemoration of his seafaring hero. With his motley crew, Captain Jack succeeds in making his voyage despite an international search for his boat by maritime authorities.

Inspiration
The film is based on a true life incident involving a Whitby man, Jack Lammiman, who declared that his ship was totally seaworthy but was being hampered from sailing by maritime rules. As in the film, he slipped out of the harbour unseen in 1991. His crew included a vicar, a lady pensioner and 62-year-old Royal Navy veteran named Hugh Taff Roberts. Lammiman successfully sailed his ship, Helga Maria, to the Arctic and fulfilled his wish to place a memorial plaque on Jan Mayen Island to honour Whitby whaling Captain, William Scoresby (see, William Scoresby his son).  During the voyage he succeeded in evading an international search by the naval authorities using a number of techniques which including painting his boat a different colour. Lammiman arrived back at his home port of Whitby to a hero's welcome, a court appearance, a fine and eventually (after non-payment of his fine) four days in jail.

References

External links
 
 

1999 films
1999 comedy films
British comedy films
Films set in Whitby
Films shot in Yorkshire
Films directed by Robert Young
1990s British films